James Earl Kennedy (born November 1, 1946) is an American former professional baseball player who appeared in 12 games  in Major League Baseball for the  St. Louis Cardinals as a shortstop (seven games) and as a second baseman (five games). Born in Tulsa, Oklahoma, he was a standout athlete at Arvin High School in California, and attended Bakersfield College and Cal Poly-San Luis Obispo.

Jim Kennedy was originally signed by the New York Yankees in 1966 as a free agent, and was acquired by the Cardinals in the 1969 Rule 5 draft. He spent most of the 1970 season in the city of his birth as a member of the Triple-A Tulsa Oilers, with his major-league trial occurring over four weeks spanning June 14 to July 9. At the plate, Kennedy collected three hits, all singles, in 24 at bats, with no bases on balls or runs batted in. In the field, he started three games at shortstop and three at second, playing in 65 total innings and committing four errors in 43 chances (.907).

His last year in pro baseball was spent back in the Yankees' organization in 1973.

References

External links

1946 births
Living people
Baseball players from Oklahoma
Binghamton Triplets players
Fort Lauderdale Yankees players
Greensboro Yankees players
Gulf Coast Yankees players
Major League Baseball infielders
Manchester Yankees players
People from Kern County, California
Portland Beavers players
St. Louis Cardinals players
Sportspeople from Tulsa, Oklahoma
Syracuse Chiefs players
Tidewater Tides players
Tulsa Oilers (baseball) players